A ghost town or ghost city is a city that has been abandoned.

Ghost city may also refer to:

 Fengdu Ghost City, a complex of shrines, temples and monasteries in Fengdu County, Chongqing, China
 Ghost City, a 1932 film starring Bill Cody 
 The Ghost City, a 1923 film serial by Jay Marchant
 Under-occupied developments in China, often referred to as "ghost cities"

See also
 Ghost town (disambiguation)